Kenneth C. Coby (born August 1, 1988), better known as his stage name Soundz is an American record producer and rapper from Milwaukee, Wisconsin signed to US Records and EMI Publishing. He was born to Charles and Lolita Coby, both former singers and musicians. . He is a producer specializing in Hip-Hop and R&B genres. Soundz has produced many songs of these genres, including "Look at Her" by One Chance, and has produced much content for Ciara, Chris Brown, Pitbull, Justin Bieber, Trina, Brandy and Young Boss. In 2019, Soundz released a documentary, 11:11.

Tracks produced 
The following list of tracks are those which have been produced by Soundz, or co-produced with Soundz.

2006 

One Chance - "One Chance (album sampler)"
 Look At Her   featuring Fabo of D4L, released as One Chance's first single

Filthy Rich - "Filty By Association"
 Mobbin' (Hat Down Low)   featuring Young Boss, released as part of a mixtape
 Get Money   released as part of a mixtape

One Chance - "Out Da Chi"
 Out Da Chi   the second track produced for One Chance, promo'd but didn't make a commercial release

2007 

2 Much - "Knock Out"
 Knock Out   produced by soundz, at the same time as "Holla At Ya Boy" which is produced by Darkchild

Al Grean - "Sampler / Unreleased"
 Throwin' Ones   featuring Courtney of One Chance
 Red Carpet   recorded for including on a possible future album

Atozzio - "He Say She Say"
 He Say She Say

Young Boss - "In New Jerzey"
 In New Jerzey   featured on Black Noize Entertainment's Best of Jerzey CD

Pitbull - "The Boatlift"
 Go Girl   featuring Trina & Young Boss, also released as a single

i15
In the Studio
Blazed and Faded
Work Ya way up
Fix
100 degrees
White Nike ya

2008 
Usher - Here I Stand
Love in This Club, Pt. II (featuring Beyoncé & Lil Wayne)
Brandy - Human
A Capella (Something's Missing)
Sterling Simms - Your's, Mine and the Truth- Release Date: 12/23/08
Doin Dat
Boom Boom Room (Making Music)
Playa
Brutha- Brutha
Ghost
Noel Gourdin - After My Time
Led You On
Asia Cruise - Who is Asia Cruise (Album shelved)
Walk Me Out

2009 
Huey - Strictly Business
No Make Up (featuring Trey Songz)
Chilli - Bi-Polar
Flirt
One Chance - TBA
Out Dem Clothes
Trey Songz -Ready
Brand NewLeToya Luckett'' - Lady Love
Lazy

2010 

Ciara - Basic Instinct
Gimmie Dat
Heavy Rotation

Rihanna - Loud
Skin

N-Dubz - Love.Live.Life
Living For The Moment

2011 
Jawan Harris - N/A
Another Planet (featuring Chris Brown)
Scholarship

Bryan J - N/A
Let Me Take You Out (featuring Travis Porter)

Flo Rida - N/A
Broke It Down

Gail Scott - N/A
Jack N' Jill

Kelly Rowland - N/A
Make Believe

2012 
Justin Bieber - Believe (Justin Bieber album)
Out of Town Girl

2013 
Ciara - Ciara (album)
 Sophomore
 DUI
Boy Outta Here (featuring Rick Ross)

Justin Bieber - Journals (album)
 Confident (featuring Chance the Rapper)
 What's Hatnin' (featuring Future)
Flatline Audio

[Jamzee
]

2014 
Justin Bieber - Unreleased
 Infectious
Audio
Supermodel Ft. Tyga Audio
Yea Ya Audio
Meet Me At The Club Ft. Khalil Audio
For Sure Ft. Lil Za

Trey Songz - Trigga (album)
 Foreign
 Foreign Remix (feat. Justin Bieber)

Chris Brown - X (album)
 101 (Interlude)

K. Michelle - Anybody Wanna Buy a Heart?
 Hard to Do

Kid Ink - My Own Lane
 Star Player

2015 
Rae Sremmurd - SremmLife
 Throw Sum Mo (featuring Nicki Minaj & Young Thug)

Casey Veggies - Live & Grow
 A Little Time

Justin Bieber - Purpose
 No Sense (featuring Travis Scott) (produced with Mike Dean)

Jeremih - Late Nights
 Woosah (featuring Juicy J & Twista) (produced with Pharrell Williams)
 Royalty (featuring Big Sean & Future) (produced with Metro Boomin & Dre Moon)
 Paradise (produced with Vinylz & Mick Schultz)

2020 
Toni Braxton - Spell My Name
 Gotta Move On (featuring H.E.R.) (produced with Jeremih)

References

1985 births
Living people
American hip hop record producers
African-American male rappers
Midwest hip hop musicians
Musicians from Atlanta
Rappers from Wisconsin
People from Decatur, Georgia
Musicians from Milwaukee
21st-century American rappers
21st-century American male musicians
21st-century African-American musicians
20th-century African-American people